David Crowe may refer to:

 David Crowe (software engineer) (born 1966), American businessman and software engineer
 David Crowe (comedian), comedian from Seattle, Washington
 Dave Crowe (1933–2000), New Zealand cricketer
 David M. Crowe, historian and Elon University Professor Emeritus

See also
 David Crow (disambiguation)